The Meridian Idaho Temple is a temple of the Church of Jesus Christ of Latter-day Saints in Meridian, Idaho.  The intent to build the temple was announced by church president Thomas S. Monson on April 4, 2011, during the church's semi-annual general conference.

History
On December 19, 2011, it was announced that the Meridian Idaho Temple would be constructed at 7345 North Linder Road, north of the intersection of North Linder Road and Chinden Blvd.

David A. Bednar, of the  Quorum of the Twelve Apostles, presided at the temple's groundbreaking on August 23, 2014.  A public open house was held from October 21 through November 11, 2017. The temple was dedicated on November 19, 2017 by Dieter F. Uchtdorf.

The temple's design incorporates seismic standards above the code requirements, including its exterior cladding. The cladding is connected to the steel frame so that it discharges energy through a rocking motion and acts like a buffer in the event of an earthquake.  The temple interior includes marble quarried from Egypt, Italy, and Spain.  According to the church, the temple's design includes the syringa (Idaho' state flower) and golds, blues and greens in the wool rugs and stained glass, reflecting Idaho harvest and nature.

In 2020, like all the church's other temples, the Meridian Idaho Temple was closed in response to the coronavirus pandemic.

See also

 Comparison of temples of The Church of Jesus Christ of Latter-day Saints
 List of temples of The Church of Jesus Christ of Latter-day Saints
 List of temples of The Church of Jesus Christ of Latter-day Saints by geographic region
 Temple architecture (Latter-day Saints)
 The Church of Jesus Christ of Latter-day Saints in Idaho

References

External links
Meridian Idaho Temple Official site
Meridian Idaho Temple at ChurchofJesusChristTemples.org

2017 establishments in Idaho
21st-century Latter Day Saint temples
Temples (LDS Church) in Idaho
Meridian, Idaho
Religious buildings and structures completed in 2017